Dədəgünəş (also, Dedagyunash and Dedegyunesh) is a village and municipality in the Shamakhi Rayon of Azerbaijan.  It has a population of 194.

References 

Populated places in Shamakhi District